Calosima argyrosplendella is a moth in the family Blastobasidae. It is found in the United States, including Maryland, Pennsylvania, Louisiana, Florida, Maine and West Virginia.

References

Moths described in 1910
argyrosplendella